The 47th annual Toronto International Film Festival was held from September 8 to 18, 2022.

The 2022 festival was staged primarily in-person; a small selection of films were offered on the Digital TIFF Bell Lightbox platform, but this represented a much smaller proportion of the overall lineup than in 2020 and 2021. The festival also saw the return of its networking and gala events, which were also suspended or held virtually in 2020 and 2021 due to the COVID-19 pandemic in Toronto.

As of mid-July, the festival had diverged from its usual practice of releasing a list of ten or twenty films to start its programming announcements, and instead issued a number of single-film announcements, before finally releasing its first extended list of the full gala and special presentations programs on July 28. Additional films were announced throughout August, until the full schedule was released on August 23. Festival CEO Cameron Bailey indicated that the full lineup would comprise around 200 feature films and about 40 short films, the largest lineup the festival has booked since the pre-pandemic 2019 edition.

Sally El Hosaini's The Swimmers was the opening film, and the closing film was Mary Harron's Dalíland. The Fabelmans, which screened as a special presentation and won the People's Choice Award, marked the first time in history that a Steven Spielberg film premiered at the festival. Jordan Peele's Nope, although already released in theaters prior to the festival, was also screened in IMAX at the Cinesphere as a special presentation in the main festival slate.

The festival also indicated that in light of the 2022 Russian invasion of Ukraine, state-backed Russian films and organizations would be banned from the festival, although participation by independent Russian filmmakers would still be permitted.

Awards

TIFF Tribute Awards
The TIFF Tribute Awards, the festival's program of honouring film personnel for their overall achievements in cinema, were presented early during the festival run.

The cast of My Policeman—Harry Styles, Emma Corrin, Gina McKee, Linus Roache, David Dawson, and Rupert Everett—were named as the recipients of one of the two awards for actors, marking the first time the award has been presented to an ensemble cast rather than an individual, while Sam Mendes has been named as the recipient of the Director Award. Brendan Fraser received a Tribute Award for Performance in The Whale.

Composer Hildur Guðnadóttir was named the recipient of the Variety Artisan Award, Sally El Hosaini was named the winner of the Emerging Talent Award, Buffy Sainte-Marie was the recipient of the Jeff Skoll Award in Impact Media, and Michelle Yeoh was named the winner of the inaugural Share Her Journey Groundbreaker Award.

Regular awards
The festival's main awards for films in the festival program, including the People's Choice Award, were presented on September 18.

Official selections

Gala Presentations

Special Presentations

Contemporary World Cinema
Ulrich Seidl's Sparta was withdrawn by the festival after allegations of child exploitation on set surfaced.

TIFF Docs

Discovery

Platform

Midnight Madness
Following its premiere on September 14, TIFF was forced to cancel followup screenings of Vera Drew's film The People's Joker following a rights conflict with Warner Bros. over the film's unauthorized use of The Joker.

Primetime

Short Cuts

Wavelengths

Festival at Home
A selection of films from the above programs that was available for home viewing through the Digital TIFF Bell Lightbox platform.

Industry Selects
Films that were available for screening by film buyers and industry professionals, but not open to the general public.

Festival Street
Older movies that were shown at the OLG Cinema Park, an open-air cinema run by TIFF at David Pecaut Square. Many featured actors and/or directors involved with TIFF 2022 selections.

TIFF Cinematheque

Canada's Top Ten
The festival's annual year-end Canada's Top Ten list, collecting the films named as the top Canadian films of the year by critics and film festival programmers from across Canada, was released on December 8, 2022.

Feature films
Black Ice — Hubert Davis
Brother — Clement Virgo
Crimes of the Future — David Cronenberg
I Like Movies — Chandler Levack
Riceboy Sleeps — Anthony Shim
Rosie — Gail Maurice
Something You Said Last Night — Luis De Filippis
This House (Cette maison) — Miryam Charles
To Kill a Tiger — Nisha Pahuja
Viking — Stéphane Lafleur

Short films
Belle River — Guillaume Fournier, Samuel Matteau, Yannick Nolin
Bill Reid Remembers — Alanis Obomsawin
The Flying Sailor — Wendy Tilby, Amanda Forbis
Lay Me by the Shore — David Findlay
Municipal Relaxation Module — Matthew Rankin
Nanitic — Carol Nguyen
No Ghost in the Morgue — Marilyn Cooke
Same Old — Lloyd Lee Choi
Simo — Aziz Zoromba
Violet Gave Willingly — Claire Sanford

References

External links
 

2022
Toronto
2022 in Toronto
2022 in Canadian cinema
September 2022 events in Canada